The Clinic is a 2010 Australian horror thriller film written and directed by James Rabbitts, shot in Deniliquin, NSW, Australia. and follows six abducted women and their newborn babies.

Plot
The Clinic is set in the year 1979. A young mother-to-be, Beth Church, is traveling with her fiancé Cameron. After narrowly avoiding an accident on the road, they stop at a motel in the (fictional) small town of Montgomery. Cameron goes for a midnight stroll and comes back to find his fiancée missing. After a quick search, Cameron calls the local police. Following the arrival of the police, Cameron attacks the motel owner out of frustration and the authorities arrest him. He later attempts to escape and is killed in a car crash.

Beth later awakens naked in an abandoned warehouse, lying in a bath tub filled with ice and water. She discovers a C-section scar on her abdomen and realizes her baby has been stolen. She also finds a white smock with the Roman numeral DCVIII written on the breast. Alone and afraid for her child, Beth wanders outside of the facility where she finds three other mothers who have also been kidnapped and had their unborn children surgically removed. The group finds another woman, barely alive, with her womb surgically opened, who declares her child to be "blue."

As the mothers search around, they discover that their babies are alive and locked in cages, with colored clips that are matched to a colored tag sewn inside their true mother's abdomen. The only way to match the mother to the child is to remove the tag from their abdomens, which will lead to death by blood loss. One of the mothers decides the only way to find out which baby is hers is to kill the other women, remove their tag, and find her baby through the process of elimination. One by one, the women are picked off by the crazed mother until Beth catches and fatally injures her. Before she dies, she threatens to drop the remaining tag down a hole unless Beth promises to take care of her baby as well. The woman dies and Beth takes the tag from her hand. She then uses the tags to find the color for her baby. As she returns to find that the babies are no longer in their crib cages, she is knocked out by an unknown assailant.

Beth regains consciousness and finds herself chained to the floor. She sees a Russian couple inspecting her baby and they reveal their scam: prospective parents receive a baby to adopt based on their mother's performance in the warehouse experiment; the winning mother has the strongest child and that child is the one set for adoption. The woman running the operation runs away with Beth's baby. Beth frees herself and confronts her, only to discover that she herself was picked up as a baby from this facility by her adoptive parents. Beth takes her final revenge on the woman and escapes with her child. Months later, she visits the grave site of her biological mother and goes to meet the man she believes to be her biological father.

Cast
 Tabrett Bethell as Beth Church (DCVIII, Violet)
 Freya Stafford as Veronica (DCVII, Yellow)
 Andy Whitfield as Cameron Marshall
 Clare Bowen as Ivy (DCVI, Orange)
 Marshall Napier as Officer Marvin Underwood
 Liz Alexander as Ms. Shepard
 Sophie Lowe as Allison (DCV, Green)
 Boris Brkic as Hank
 Marcel Bracks as Duncan Shepard
 Adrienne Pickering as Jane Doe (DCIV, Red)
 Anni Finsterer as Locker Room Woman (DCIII, Blue)

Release
The film was screened in the USA on 4 November 2009 at the American Film Market. Another screening followed on 10 October 2010 at the ScreamFest Horror Film Festival. The movie received mixed reviews.

Reception
The Clinic received negative reviews from critics and audiences.

Accolades
Tabrett Bethell was nominated for Best Actress at the Fangoria Chainsaw Awards in 2012.

References

External links
 
 

2010 films
2010 horror thriller films
2010s pregnancy films
Fetal abduction in fiction
Films shot in Australia
Australian horror thriller films
Australian pregnancy films
2010s English-language films